KMZN (740 AM) is a commercial radio station licensed to serve the community of Oskaloosa, Iowa. The station primarily broadcasts a classic hits format. KMZN is owned by Jomast Corporation. It was first licensed on January 15, 1951, as KBOE.

740 AM is a Canadian clear-channel frequency on which CFZM in Toronto, Ontario is the dominant Class A station.  KMZN must reduce nighttime power to only 10 watts in order to prevent interference to the skywave signal of CFZM.

Programming
KMZN often provides live coverage of William Penn Statesmen & Oskaloosa Indian sports events as well as coverage of Iowa Hawkeye sports, NASCAR racing and area race tracks such as the Southern Iowa Speedway, Eddyville Raceway Park, Eldon Raceway, and Knoxville Raceway.

On August 1, 2015, KMZN dropped its simulcast with KBOE-FM and switched to sports, with programming from CBS Sports Radio.

In January 2017 KMZN changed format from sports to classic hits.

Previous logo
 (KMZN's logo under former simulcast with KBOE-FM 104.9)

External links
KMZN Facebook
KMZN website

FCC History Cards for KMZN

MZN